Braunbuch — Kriegs- und Naziverbrecher in der Bundesrepublik: Staat - Wirtschaft - Verwaltung - Armee - Justiz - Wissenschaft (English title: Brown Book — War and Nazi Criminals in the Federal Republic: State, Economy, Administration, Army, Justice, Science) is a book written by Albert Norden in 1965. In this book Norden claimed that 1,800 politicians and other prominents in West Germany held prominent positions in Germany prior to 1945, became rich etc.

Altogether 1,800 West German persons and their past were covered: especially 15 Ministers and state secretaries, 100 admirals and generals, 828 judges or state lawyers and high law officers, 245 officials of the Foreign Office and of embassies and consulates in leading position, 297 high police officers and officers of the Verfassungsschutz. The first brown book was seized in West Germany — on Frankfurt Book Fair — by judicial resolution.

The contents of this book received substantial attention in West Germany and other countries. The West German government stated, at that time, that it was "all falsification". Later on, however, it became clear that the data of the book were largely correct. Hanns Martin Schleyer, for example, really had been a member of the SS. The book was translated into 10 languages.  Amongst the reactions to it was also a similar West German book of the same name, covering the topic of Nazis re-emerging in high-level positions in the GDR.

In addition to the Braunbuch the educational booklet Das ganze System ist braun (The whole system is brown) was published in the GDR.

Bibliography

"Braunbuch.Kriegs-und Naziverbrecher in der Bundesrepublik", Berlin 1960, 1965, 1968
Olaf Kappelt: Braunbuch DDR. Nazis in der DDR. Reichmann Verlag, Berlin (West) 1981.

See also
The Brown Book of the Reichstag Fire and Hitler Terror
Brown Book (album)

References

External links
Brown Book: War and Nazi Criminals in West Germany. State, Economy, Administration, Army, Justice, Science, English translation in PDF format
Braunbuch free download of German original at the Internet Archive
Nees, Verena. "The Nazi past of Germany’s post-war political elite." World Socialist Website. July 7, 2015.

1965 non-fiction books
German biographies
20th-century history books
History books about West Germany
History books about Nazi Germany
East German books